Asociația Club Sportiv Flacăra Horezu, commonly known as Flacăra Horezu, or simply as Flacăra, is a Romanian football club originally from Horezu, Vâlcea County. They currently play in the Liga III.

Chronology of names

Honours
Liga IV – Vâlcea County
Winners (5): 1996–97, 1997–98, 2013–14, 2014–15, 2017–18
Runners-up (3): 1979–80 ,2005–06, 2015–16

Cupa României – Vâlcea County
Winners (1): 2005–06

Players

First-team squad

Out on loan

Club officials

Board of directors

Current technical staff

League history

Notable former players
The footballers mentioned below have played at least 1 season for Flacăra and also played in Liga 1 for another team.

  Radu Bîrzan
  Florin Cioablă
  Ciprian Dinu
  Mansour Gueye
  Robert Ivan
  Florin Matache
  Cristian Munteanu
  Florinel Sandu
  Alin Pencea
  Robert Popa
  Samson Nwabueze
  Bobi Verdeș
  Arthur Bote
  Ovye Monday Shedrack
  Ionuț Cioinac
  Andrei Mirică
  George Buliga

References

External links

Association football clubs established in 1963
Football clubs in Vâlcea County
Liga III clubs
Liga IV clubs
Flacăra Horezu
1963 establishments in Romania